The fifth season of the One Piece anime series was directed by Kōnosuke Uda and produced by Toei Animation. Like the rest of the series, it follows the adventures of Monkey D. Luffy and his Straw Hat Pirates, but instead of adaptating part of Eiichiro Oda's One Piece manga, it features three completely original, self-contained story arcs. The first five episodes, each following their own plots, form the  arc. The next three episodes make up the  storyline and focus on the Straw Hats meeting an old moneylender. The last five episodes form the  arc and deal with the protagonists getting trapped inside a mysterious, rainbow-colored mist.

The season initially ran from November 3, 2002, through February 2, 2003, on Fuji Television in Japan and was released on DVD in five compilations, each containing one disc with two or three episodes, by Avex Mode between March 3 and July 7, 2004. The season was then licensed for a heavily edited dubbed broadcast in English by 4Kids Entertainment. Their adaptation ran from August 4, 2007, through September 22, 2007, on Cartoon Network and omitted seven of the season's thirteen episodes. It was the last season to be dubbed by 4Kids Entertainment. Starting with the sixth season, Funimation took over dubbing new episodes for broadcast on Cartoon Network. Eventually they began redubbing the series from the start for uncut release on DVD and released the fifth season, relabeled as "One Piece: Season Two – Seventh Voyage", on May 11, 2010.

Toei Animation's version makes use of three pieces of theme music: one opening theme and two ending themes. The ending themes are "Shining Ray" by Janne Da Arc in Japanese and Justin Houston in English for the first two episodes and "Free Will" by Ruppina in Japanese and Kristine Sa in English for the rest of the season. The 4Kids Entertainment dub uses original theme music in their adaptation.


Episode list

Home releases

Japanese

English
In North America, this season was recategorized as the end of "Season Two" for its DVD release by Funimation Entertainment. The Australian Season Two set was renamed Collection 11.

References

2002 Japanese television seasons
2003 Japanese television seasons
One Piece seasons
One Piece episodes